Goren is a surname. Notable people with the surname include:

Ali Ferit Gören (1913-1987), Austrian-Turkish Olympic sprinter
Arthur A. Goren, scholar and professor of American Jewish history
Charles Goren, American bridge player, writer, and advocate
Lee Goren, Canadian hockey player
 Or Goren (born 1956), Israeli basketball player
Shlomo Goren, former Ashkenazi Chief Rabbi of Israel
Ran Goren, Israeli fighter pilot and Major General of the IDF

Fictional characters
Robert Goren, a character in the television series Law & Order: Criminal Intent